The 2012 America East men's basketball tournament was held from March 1–4 at Chase Arena at Reich Family Pavilion in West Hartford, Connecticut, with the final held March 10 between the Stony Brook Seawolves and the Vermont Catamounts.  As per America East tournament regulations, the final took place at Stony Brook University Arena, on the campus of Stony Brook University, the top and highest remaining seed.  The Catamounts prevailed, 52-43, and earned an automatic bid to the 2012 NCAA tournament. All games except the play-in game was televised by the ESPN family of networks, including the Championship game on ESPN2.

Bracket and Results

Championship game hosted by Stony Brook

See also
America East Conference

References

External links
 2012 America East tournament Central

America East Conference men's basketball tournament
2011–12 America East Conference men's basketball season
America East Men's Basketball
America East Men's Basketball